Resurrection Fest is a rock music festival that takes place in Viveiro, region of Lugo, Spain. This festival has been held annually since 2006 during July or early August and features mainly heavy metal, hardcore punk and punk rock bands. Since its emergence it has become one of the most important music festivals in Spain due to its genre specialization. In 2013 edition set its record of 33,000 attendees, with a measured socio-economic impact of 3.3 million euros in the region. In 2015, these numbers increased to more than 54,500 people and a 6.15-million euros impact.

Along its history, more than 200 bands have performed, including world-wide important groups such as Iron Maiden, Korn, Motörhead, Kiss, Scorpions, Rammstein, Slipknot, In Flames, Black Label Society, Megadeth, Anthrax, Slayer, Cannibal Corpse, Sabaton, NOFX, Lamb of God, Refused, Testament, Five Finger Death Punch, Trivium, Down, Crowbar, Sick of It All, Bad Religion, Bullet for My Valentine, Heaven Shall Burn, Pennywise, Hatebreed, At the Gates, Dead Kennedys, Exodus, and Black Flag.

History
The festival was first held in August 2006 under the name of Viveiro Summer Fest, and admission was free thanks to local government. Two days before the event, its headliner, Sick of It All, had to cancel its show because of a sudden illness of one of their members. Besides the lack of support after this accident, it was postponed until November of the same year being called Resurrection Fest and it enjoyed great success.

Nowadays it is a four-day festival (3-days since 2010, 4-days since 2015), the number of performances has reached 78 in 2015, and every year the attendance record is broken with the current one of 54,500 people in 2015, coming mostly from all over Spain. Other countries like Portugal or France are increasingly represented.

Line-ups
Confirmed bands during the different editions of the festival:

2006
Dates: 18 November

2007
Dates: 17 and 18 August

2008
Dates: 1 and 2 August

2009
Dates: 31 July and 1 August

2010
Dates: 29, 30 and 31 July

2011
Dates: 28, 29 and 30 July

2012
Dates: 2, 3 and 4 August

2013
Dates: 1, 2 and 3 August

2015
Dates: 15, 16, 17 and 18 July

2016

Dates: 6, 7, 8, and 9 July

Venue: Campo de fútbol Celeiro, Viveiro

Wednesday, July 6, 2016

Electric Callboy
For the Glory
Hyde Abbey
Narco
Siberian Meat Grinder
Skindred
Strikeback

Thursday, July 7, 2016

Bad Religion
Bring Me the Horizon
Brujería
Crisix
Fleshgod Apocalypse
H2O
Implore
Minor Empires
Norma Jean
Persefone
Rotting Christ
Soldier
Stick to Your Guns
TesseracT
The Casualties
Tierra Hostil
Viva Belgrado
Volbeat
Walls of Jericho
While She Sleeps
Wormed

Friday, July 8, 2016

Abaixo Cu Sistema
Angel Crew
Angelus Apatrida
Arkangel
Battlecross
Being as an Ocean
Dark Tranquillity
Desakato
Frank Carter & The Rattlesnakes
Gojira
Hamlet
Hatebreed
In Mute
Madball
Never Draw Back
Protest the Hero
Rise of the Northstar
Sinistro
The Offspring
Thirteen Bled Promises
Turisas

Saturday, July 9, 2016

Abbath
Bullet for My Valentine
Cannibal Grandpa
Destruction
Enslaved
Entombed A.D.
Graveyard
Iron Maiden
Municipal Waste
Nashville Pussy
No Fun at All
Obsidian Kingdom
Shining
The Goddamn Gallows
The Raven Age
The Real McKenzies
The Shrine
The Wild Lies
Thy Art Is Murder
True Mountains
Uncle Acid & the deadbeats

2019

See also 
 Viveiro

References

External links 
 Official Resurrection Fest website

Heavy metal festivals in Spain
2006 establishments in Spain
Music festivals in Spain
Recurring events established in 2006